The Galapagos bullhead shark, Heterodontus quoyi, is a bullhead shark of the family Heterodontidae found in the tropical eastern Pacific Ocean between latitudes 0° to 10°S, at depths between 3 and 40 m. It can reach a length of 1.07 m.

The reproduction of this bullhead shark is oviparous.

References

External links
 

Heterodontidae
Fish described in 1840